Glenconner may refer to:

 Baron Glenconner, a peerage created in 1911, also known as the Tennant Baronetcy
 Edward Tennant, 1st Baron Glenconner (1859-1920)
 Colin Tennant, 3rd Baron Glenconner (1926-2010)
 Anne Tennant, Baroness Glenconner (born 1932)